The EMD SW600 is a diesel switcher locomotive built by General Motors Electro-Motive Division between February 1954 and January 1962.  Power was provided by an EMD 567C 6-cylinder engine, which generated 600 horsepower (450 kW).

Original owners
15 examples of this model were built for American railroads and industrials.

See also
List of GM-EMD locomotives

References

 A J Kristopans GM Locomotive Serial Number Page: https://web.archive.org/web/20141012110456if_/http://utahrails.net/ajkristopans/SWITCHERS201Aand567.php#sw600

SW0600
B-B locomotives
Diesel-electric locomotives of the United States
Railway locomotives introduced in 1954
Standard gauge locomotives of the United States

Shunting locomotives